Randallia is a genus of true crabs in the family Leucosiidae. There are about 17 described species in Randallia.

Species
These 17 species belong to the genus Randallia:

 Randallia agaricias Rathbun, 1898
 Randallia americana (Rathbun, 1894)
 Randallia angelica Garth
 Randallia bulligera M. J. Rathbun, 1898
 Randallia curacaoensis Rathbun, 1922
 Randallia distincta M. J. Rathbun, 1893
 Randallia eburnea Alcock 1896
 Randallia gilberti M. J. Rathbun, 1906
 Randallia granulata Miers, 1886
 Randallia jingomao Hu & Tao, 2004
 Randallia laevis (Borradaile, 1916)
 Randallia minuta Rathbun, 1935
 Randallia ornata (J. W. Randall, 1840) (globose sand crab)
 Randallia pleistocenica Rathbun, 1926
 Randallia prolanata Hu & Tao, 1996
 Randallia saitoensis Karasawa, 1993
 Randallia strouhali Bachmayer, 1953

References

Further reading

 

Decapods
Articles created by Qbugbot